Sky Sci-Fi (formerly Sci Fi Channel and Syfy) is a British pay television channel service specialising in science fiction, fantasy and horror shows and movies. It is owned by NBCUniversal International Networks, a division of NBCUniversal and as of 2018, Sky Group.

History

It was launched in 1995 as a localised variant of the US network Sci Fi Channel (now Syfy), with a similar programming line-up. It was on air each day from 8am until 2am, but only on cable as a lack of transponder space on satellite meant that it was only able broadcast for a few hours each day on that platform. It wasn't until the launch of Sky Digital in 1998 that the channel's full broadcast hours were available on satellite.

On 13 April 2010, Sci Fi Channel was relaunched as Syfy, as part of an ongoing global rebranding. The relaunch was accompanied by the premieres of V and Human Target. The channel was given a new on-air look and a tagline of "Imagine greater".

Sky applied for a Sky Sci-Fi trademark on 4 May 2022. On 14 June 2022 Sky confirmed that the channel rebrand would take place at 11am on 26 July, accompanied by a refreshed schedule of new and existing content.

Programming
Programming in the channel's early years followed the US channel's model, then consisting largely of archive shows such as Lost in Space, The Incredible Hulk, Buck Rogers in the 25th Century, and films from the Paramount and MCA vaults. The channel was also notable for being one of the first UK television channels to show anime movies and television series on a regular basis. These programming choices were supplemented by a few 1980s animated series shown in the mornings such as Robotech, Bionic Six and G-Force, although they were dropped as the channel's lineup became more independent of the original US channel.

Currently, most archive and anime programming have been phased out of the channel, which now concentrates on contemporary show, movies, and other programming. One original UK production was the late-night show Headf**k, which featured excerpts from unusual TV shows, short films (including Chris Barfoot 'Phoenix' and 'The Reckoning') and music videos from around the world. Later episodes were presented by David Icke.

Programmes on the channel throughout more recent times have included UK premieres of big name US shows like Heroes, Flash Gordon, Eureka, and more recently Knight Rider, Legend of the Seeker and Joss Whedon's Dollhouse. Also shown as of February 2007 are digitally remastered episodes of Star Trek (not to be confused with the remastered series with new CGI); in October the channel secured an exclusive deal with CBS to air Star Trek: The Next Generation episodes, remastered from original film elements to current HD standards with new HD CGI sequences, and as of November 2012 have been broadcasting them in (mostly) chronological order.

Acquired programming
U.S. imports include series from Fox, HBO, NBC and Syfy among others.
The Ark (April 2023)
Chucky
From
Quantum Leap
Reginald the Vampire
SurrealEstate

Second-run programming
The acquired programming listed below previously aired on either Sky One, Sky Atlantic or Sky Comedy

A Discovery of Witches
Fortitude
Futurama
Intergalactic
The Leftovers
Lovecraft Country
Manifest
Penny Dreadful: City of Angels
Room 104
Stan Lee's Lucky Man
True Blood
Watchmen
Westworld

Repeat programming

Alphas
Blood & Treasure
Dark Matter
Day Of The Dead
Firefly
Fringe
Grimm
Human Target
Infinity Train
It
Killjoys
Merlin
Monstrous
The Outpost
Pandora
Project Blue Book
Siren
Spides
Star Trek: Deep Space Nine
Star Trek: Enterprise
Star Trek: The Next Generation
Star Trek: Voyager
Stargate Atlantis
Stargate SG-1
Train
Trickster
The Twilight Zone
V
Vagrant Queen
Wynonna Earp

Viewership and reach
As of April 2008, the channel reached an average of three million UK and Ireland households a week, appealing equally to male and female demographics.

Initially, the channel shared its analogue satellite transponder with no less than five other channels, limiting its output to early evenings and late nights with the rest of its continuous daytime programming (including cartoons) restricted to cable customers. With the launch of Sky Digital in the UK the channel eventually expanded to exclusive broadcasting on its own channel and now broadcasts round the clock most days each week.

Most watched programmes
The following is a list of the ten most watched shows on Syfy (previously Sci-Fi), based on Live +7 data supplied by BARB up to 10 September 2017. The number of viewers does not include viewers from Ireland, repeats or airings on Syfy +1.

HD feed
A high-definition simulcast channel was launched on the Sky+ HD service as the 31st high-definition channel on Sky. A range of high definition movies, including Sci Fi Channel original production Ba'al: The Storm God, aired on the channel along with Eli Stone, Tin Man and Sanctuary.

It was added to Virgin Media on 1 April 2010.

See also
List of science fiction television programs
List of programmes broadcast by Syfy (British and Irish TV channel)

Notes

References

External links

 
Syfy
English-language television stations in the United Kingdom
British science fiction
Television channels and stations established in 1995
Sky television channels
Science fiction television channels
1995 establishments in the United Kingdom